Šumber is a village and ruinous castle in the eastern part of Istria County, Croatia, in the municipality of Sveta Nedelja. In 2011, the population of the village was 381.

Description 

Castle history 

The castle was built at the site of the prehistoric hillfort in the former village Stari Grad (Old Town). The site was first mentioned in documents in 872, and in 950 when Byzantine Emperor Constantine VII Porfirogenet confirmed the presence of Slavs in these villages. In 1260, has passed into the possession of vassals of the Counts of Gorizia, the Austrian noble family Schönberg by which it got its name. Among the signatories of the peace treaty in 1274 between the Aquleia patriarch Raimondo della Torre and the Count of Gorizia Albert I, there was Teodorich de Sumberg. As a vassal of Gorizia Count Albert III, Dietrich von Schonberg in 1341 attack and plundered the countryside of Venetian Motovun. Since 1367, when counts of Gorizia became extinct, was inherited by Habsburg family and was part of the Pazin County.

At the end of the 14th century, after the extinction of the family Schönberg and marriage of Anna Schönberg with Ivan Gutenegg, the lord of Kožljak, it was connected to Kožljak estate. In 1444, Anna sold the castle to the lords of Kršan, Juraj Kerstlein (Karscheyner). After Labin in 1420 came under Venetian rule, Šumber became a border fortress between the Austrian March of Istria, and Venetian part of Istria. In 1420 Venetians occupied it but they also accepted the offer of lord of Kršan to buy the village. Therefore, it was converted into a Renaissance castle by additions of corner round semi-tower. In the war between Emperor Maximilian and Venice in 1508, Gaspar Karscheyner lost Kršan and Šumber, but in 1509 they were returned. Gaspar repaired Kršan, but in 1515 sold Šumber to the family Herberstein, lords of Lupoglav.

The Herberstein family ruled it only briefly as in 1525 exchanged it with Ferdinand I Habsburg for Reitberg. When Ferdinand became king of Croatia in 1527, he gave it to Senj and Klis captain Petar Kružić. After Kružić died in 1537, was inherited by his daughter Margareta, and with marriage, to Senj nobleman Ivan Sinković. As Sinković died in 1616 without male heirs, the inheritance have taken his daughters. At that time it was exposed to frequent Venetian attacks. Under the pretense that its lords are helping Uskoks (which was true, because many Uskoks really found refuge on the Istrian properties of Kružić and Sinković), in 1612 was devastated by the Venetian mercenaries. When the Uskoks  attacked and plundered Plomin in 1614, Šumber was again exposed to Venetian devastation. At the beginning of Uskok War, 1616, Šumber again suffers Venetian attacks and looting, which ceased only in 1617.

After the completion of the Uskok War in 1617, its defensive function was converted into a comfortable residence. In 1626 became the property of Prince Johann Ulrich von Eggenberg, whose son Anton in 1634 sold Šumber for 42,000 florins to Baron Pompeo II Brigido of Trieste, whose estate were around Lupoglav (i.e. Lupoglav, Šumber, Lesičina). This family continued to own the property until the end of feudalism in 1848.

It's a small fortress with polygonal layout defended by two round half-towers in south-eastern and south-western part, next to which is on the west wall the main entrance to the fort. On the inner side of the southern wall are the remains of a long and narrow one-story palace, and another small house is located in the northeast corner of the castle. Although the castle is largely preserved, at least according to Valvasor views from 1680, the tower and the residential wings were much higher than they are today.

Population 

Note: In 1857 and 1869 is mentioned as Sumberg, in 1880 as Gorenji Kraj, in 1890 as Šumber, in 1900 and 1910 as Šumbreg, and from 1948 again as Šumber. It contains data for village Golomičari in 1900 and 1910, for villages Grašići and Šćedin in 1900, 1910 and 1948, and for Noskovići and Radovići in 1948.

Gallery

References 

Bibliography

 
 

Sources

External links 
Sumber – Casali Sumberesi:”Schomberg castle”

Populated places in Istria County
Ruined castles in Croatia
Castles in Croatia